Jorge Pires Ferreira (12 December 1920 – 6 November 2013), known professionally as Jorge Dória, was a Brazilian actor and humorist. In 1962 he was awarded with Prêmio Saci.

Partial filmography

 Mãe (1948)
 Minas Conspiracy (1948)
 Também Somos Irmãos (1949) - Walter Mendes
 Maior Que o Ódio (1951)
 Sonho de Outono (1955)
 O Assalto ao Trem Pagador (1962) - Delegado
 Os Vencidos (1963)
 Crime no Sacopã (1963)
 Procura-se uma Rosa (1964)
 Asfalto Selvagem (1964) - Dr. Bergamini
 O Beijo (1965) - Mário Ribeiro
 História de um Crápula (1965)
 Paraíba, Vida e Morte de um Bandido (1966)
 O Mundo Alegre de Helô (1967) - Fafá
 Juventude e Ternura (1968) - Jaine
 Viver de Morrer (1969)
 As duas faces da moeda (1969)
 Pais Quadrados... Filhos Avançados (1970)
 Minha Namorada (1970)
 É Simonal (1970)
 Os Devassos (1971)
 O Pecado de Marta (1971)
 O Doce Esporte do Sexo (1971)
 Bonga, O Vagabundo (1971) - Ricardo's father
 Eu Transo, Ela Transa (1972) - Roberto
 Como É Boa Nossa Empregada (1973) - Dr. Renato ("Naná"- segment "Melhor da festa, O)
 Um Varão Entre as Mulheres (1974)
 Oh Que Delícia de Patrão (1974) - Dr. Felipe / Severino Riba / Dr. André
 O Comprador de Fazendas (1974)
 Com as Calças na Mão (1975) - Pai de Reg
 Um Soutien Para Papai (1975)
 As Secretárias... Que Fazem de Tudo (1975)
 As Aventuras de Um Detetive Português (1975) - Neiva
 Ninguém Segura Essas Mulheres (1976) - Túlio (segment "Marido Que Volta Deve Avisar")
 Lady on the Bus (1978)
 Os melhores Momentos da Pornochanchada (1978)
 Assim Era a Pornochanchada (1978)
 Teu Tua (1979) - (segment "Um Homem Debaixo da Cama")
 Perdoa-me Por Me Traíres (1980) - Doctor
 Crônica à Beira do Rio (1980) - Cronista
 O Seqüestro (1981) - Marcondes
 Pedro Mico (1985)
 The Lady from the Shanghai Cinema (1988) - Velho
 Que Rei Sou Eu? (1989, TV Series) - Vanoli Berval
 Rainha da Sucata (1990, TV Series) - Alberico
 Meu Bem, Meu Mal (1990, TV Series) - Emílio Castro
 O Lado Escuro do Coração (1992) - Librero
 Deus nos Acuda (1992, TV Series) - Tomás Euclides
 Olho no Olho (1993, TV Series) - Atila
 Quatro por Quatro (1994, TV Series) - Santinho
 Traição (1998) - Reinaldo (Dagmar's father)
 The Man of the Year (2003) - Dr. Carvalho (final film role)

References

External links

1920 births
2013 deaths
Brazilian male television actors
Brazilian male telenovela actors
Brazilian male film actors
Male actors from Rio de Janeiro (city)